Saturday Night Live (SNL) is a late-night sketch comedy and variety show created by Lorne Michaels. It premiered on the NBC Television Network on October 11, 1975, under the title NBC's Saturday Night. The show often satirizes contemporary American popular culture and politics. Saturday Night Live features a two-tiered cast: the repertory members, also known as the "Not Ready for Prime-Time Players," and newer cast members, known as "Featured Players." Each week, the show features a host, often a well-known celebrity, who delivers an opening monologue and performs in sketches with the cast. A musical guest is also invited to perform several sets (usually two, occasionally more). Every so often a host or musical guest fills both roles. With the exception of season 7 and several other rare cases, the show begins with a cold open that ends with someone breaking character and proclaiming "Live from New York, it's Saturday Night!"

Saturday Night Live is one of the longest-running network programs in American television history, with more than 900 episodes broadcast over five decades. A number of the show's sketches have been developed into feature films, including The Blues Brothers, Wayne's World, A Night at the Roxbury, Superstar, Coneheads, The Ladies Man and MacGruber.

Seasons 1 through 5 are available on DVD in Region1. Various Saturday Night Live sketches are available in several new media formats, including streaming on Hulu and Netflix. A number of sketches are available to view via the show's official YouTube channel, along with best-of compilations for sale through digital video retailers. As of October 1, 2020, the full catalogue of Saturday Night Live episodes is available on the streaming service Peacock, updated actively as new episodes release.

Episodes

Seasons 1–30 (1975–2005)

Season 31–present (2005–present)

References

Saturday Night Live
Saturday Night Live
Episodes